This event was the second edition of the Open Quimper Bretagne in 2021 after the Open d'Orléans was delayed due to the COVID-19 pandemic in France.

Sebastian Korda was the defending champion but withdrew before the tournament started due to injury. Brandon Nakashima won the title after defeating Bernabé Zapata Miralles 6–3, 6–4 in the final.

Seeds

Draw

Finals

Top half

Bottom half

References

External links
Main draw
Qualifying draw

Open Quimper Bretagne II - 1
2021 1